Luton Town Football Club is an English association football club, based in the town of Luton, Bedfordshire. The club was founded in 1885, and competes in the EFL Championship during the 2022–23 season.

The playing staff were originally organised by a trainer, and chosen for matches by a committee made up of directors led by the club's secretary. The club appointed an official manager for the first time in 1925. George Thompson took up the role in February, but left after eight months, "scalded by his experience". Thompson was not replaced until 1927, when former player John McCartney took charge. Harold Wightman worked during the early 1930s to build a team to challenge for promotion, but was sacked early on in the 1935–36 season. Without a manager, the team finished as runners-up in the Third Division South, before topping the table in 1936–37 under Ned Liddle. Dally Duncan was appointed in 1947, and during his 11-year tenure he took Luton into the First Division for the first time. After Duncan was sacked early in the 1958–59 season, the club's board of directors managed the team to the 1959 FA Cup Final.

Poor spells under four managers resulted in relegation to the Fourth Division by 1965. Allan Brown became manager in November 1966, and Luton won the division in 1967–68. Brown moved on halfway through the next season, and Alec Stock continued the revival, winning promotion to the Second Division in 1969–70. Luton won another promotion in 1973–74 to return to the top division under Harry Haslam, but Haslam was unable to prevent relegation during the following season. David Pleat became manager in 1978, and built a team that took the 1981–82 Second Division championship. Though Pleat moved on in 1986, success continued—Luton finished seventh during 1986–87, and won the Football League Cup a year later under Ray Harford. Managed by Jimmy Ryan, the team avoided relegation in 1989–90, and repeated that feat during the following season. When Ryan was then sacked in favour of a return for Pleat, Luton were relegated in 1991–92. Pleat left again in 1995, and a five-year spell under Lennie Lawrence then saw Luton drop to the third tier. A disastrous 2000–01 season—in which three managers took the helm at the club—saw Luton fall into the bottom division of the Football League for the first time since 1968.

Joe Kinnear took Luton back up at the first time of asking, but was sacked by the club's new owners following a takeover in May 2003. Mike Newell was appointed as manager, and his side became League One champions in 2004–05. Internal troubles at the club started to intensify during the summer of 2006, as the club's chairman was revealed by Newell to be making illegal payments to agents—after writing a scathing letter to the board, Newell was sacked in March 2007. Kevin Blackwell was appointed in his stead, but was also sacked less than a year later on 16 January 2008; former player Mick Harford was made Luton Town's new manager the same day, and he was unable to prevent the club's relegation in 2007–08. After being deducted a total of 30 points by the Football League and The Football Association for 2008–09, Luton were relegated to the Conference Premier; however, the club claimed a Football League Trophy victory during the same season. After two months of the 2009–10 season, Harford left the club by mutual consent, to be replaced a month later by Richard Money. Money's assistant, Gary Brabin, replaced him in March 2011, and managed the club until he was sacked a year later. His replacement, Paul Buckle, took charge in April 2012, and was himself replaced in February 2013 by John Still. Still took Luton back into the Football League in his first full season as manager, breaking a number of club records in the process.

Still guided Luton to a comfortable finish in their first season back in League Two, but was sacked by the club in December 2015 following a poor run of form. He was replaced by Nathan Jones in January 2016, who took on his first ever managerial role. Jones led the club to promotion to League One in the 2017–18 season, before departing in January 2019 to join Championship club Stoke City. He left Luton with the highest Football League points per game ratio of any manager in their history. Mick Harford returned as caretaker manager for the remainder of the 2018–19 season, leading Luton to promotion to the Championship. Graeme Jones was appointed as permanent manager in May 2019, though left the club by mutual consent before the end of the 2019–20 season with the club 23rd in the table. Nathan Jones was reappointed in May 2020 and guided Luton to Championship safety on the final day of the season.

Managers
All first-team matches in national or international competition are counted, except the abandoned 1939–40 Football League season and matches in wartime leagues and cups. Names of caretaker managers are supplied where known, and periods of caretaker-management are highlighted in italics. Win percentage is rounded to one decimal place. Statistics are complete up to and including the match played on 15 March 2023.

Key

M: Matches played
W: Matches won
D: Matches drawn
L: Matches lost

Footnotes

A.  Secretary-manager
B.  The club was managed by a committee during these times, made up of the club's trainer and directors.
C.  George Martin was appointed as coach on 1 August 1939, and promoted to manager on 4 December 1944.

References
General
Dates and match statistics sourced from: 
Dates and match statistics sourced from: 
Club honours sourced from: 

Specific

Managers
 
Luton Town